Theodoros Alexis (born 6 May 1975) is a Greek former professional footballer who played as a midfielder.

References

1975 births
Living people
Greek footballers
Association football forwards
Apollon Smyrnis F.C. players
AEK Athens F.C. players
Athinaikos F.C. players
A.P.O. Akratitos Ano Liosia players
Panelefsiniakos F.C. players
Marko F.C. players
Super League Greece players
Greece under-21 international footballers